The Bedlam cube is a solid dissection puzzle invented by British puzzle expert Bruce Bedlam.

Design 

The puzzle consists of thirteen polycubic pieces: twelve pentacubes and one tetracube. The objective is to assemble these pieces into a 4 x 4 x 4 cube. There are 19,186 distinct ways of doing so, up to rotations and reflections.

The Bedlam cube is one unit per side larger than the 3 x 3 x 3 Soma cube, and is much more difficult to solve.

History 

Two of the BBC's 'Dragons' from Dragons' Den, Rachel Elnaugh and Theo Paphitis, were to invest in the Bedlam cube during the 2005 series. They offered £100,000 for a 30% share of equity in Bedlam Puzzles. Danny Bamping (the entrepreneur behind Bedlam cube) finally chose a bank loan instead of their investment, as seen in the relevant "Where Are They Now" episode of Dragons' Den.

Records 

According to Guinness World Records, the official world record for assembling the Bedlam Cube is 11.03 seconds by Danny Bamping on 9 November 2006. The blindfolded record is 27.21 seconds by Aleksandr Iljasov on 25 February 2008.

See also
 Slothouber–Graatsma puzzle
 Conway puzzle
 Polycube
 Soma cube

References

External links
 The Official Site of Bedlam Puzzles (as was, 2011: last valid archive copy)
 Bedlam Cube solver
 All 19,186 Bedlam Cube Solutions
 Bedlam Cube Demonstration Software

Tiling puzzles
Recreational mathematics
Mechanical puzzle cubes